The Central Deserts robust slider (Lerista desertorum)  is a species of skink found in Northern Territory, South Australia, and Western Australia.

References

Lerista
Reptiles described in 1919
Taxa named by Richard Sternfeld